Neal Stuart Young (born 1947) is an American physician and researcher, chief of the Hematology Branch of the National Institutes of Health (NIH), and Director of the Center for Human Immunology at the NIH in Bethesda, Maryland. He is primarily known for work in the pathophysiology and treatment of aplastic anemia, and is also known for his contributions to the pathophysiology of parvovirus B19 infection.

Biography 

Young was born in New York City on April 13, 1947. He received an A.B. from Harvard College in 1967, and a M.D. from Johns Hopkins School of Medicine in 1971. His internal medicine residency was at Massachusetts General Hospital. In 1976, he completed a clinical fellowship in the Hematology-Oncology Division at Barnes Hospital, Washington University School of Medicine.

Young's entire career has been in the Intramural Research Program of the National Institutes of Health in Bethesda, Maryland. He has been Chief of the Hematology Branch of the National Heart, Lung, and Blood Institute since 1994 and was appointed Director of the Trans-NIH Center for Human Immunology, Autoimmunity, and Inflammation in 2007.

Professional work 

Young joined the U.S. Public Health Service in 1973 and worked at the NIH in the laboratories of Christen Anfinsen (in the immunochemistry of hemoglobin) and Arthur Nienhuis (in globin gene regulation). He directed the first multicenter clinical trial using antithymocyte globulin for the treatment of aplastic anemia in the United States. This therapy is now the standard treatment for the disease worldwide. He is credited with contributing to understanding the pathophysiology of the disease as immune-mediated and with developing immunotherapy for aplastic anemia that has dramatically improved survival rates for the disease. Prior to the introduction of immunotherapy in the early 1980s, the disease was largely fatal with survival rates around 10% one year following the diagnosis, whereas now survival rates are estimated to be 80% or more. In 2012 he was awarded a Samuel J. Heyman Service to America Medal in Science and Environment.

He also made significant contributions to the understanding of parvovirus B19 infection in hematopoietic cells; he identified the erythrocyte antigen P (globoside) as the cell receptor for parvovirus B19 and that P antigen deficiency confers resistance to parvovirus B19 infection. Young also characterized the subsequent hematologic manifestations in patients with sickle cell disease or immune deficient individuals. More recently, he developed a vaccine against parvovirus B19 infection that is currently under trial.

In 2005, he and his postdoctoral fellow, Rodrigo Calado, described for the first time in humans mutations in the telomerase gene, TERT, residing among patients with aplastic anemia.  This work demonstrated an inherited pattern for apparently acquired aplastic anemia and indicated that deficiency in telomerase genes cause telomere shortening, reduced hematopoietic stem cell function, and bone marrow failure. He later found that telomerase mutations also are a risk factor for acute myeloid leukemia and hepatic liver cirrhosis.

He has published over 500 scientific articles, original research as well as reviews, which span basic molecular and cell biology, clinical research, and epidemiology and are highly cited. An article addressing the economics of scientific publishing in PLoS Medicine attracted media attention.

He is a co-editor for Seminars in Hematology and has written or edited a number of monographs and textbooks in hematology.

Awards and honors 

Castle Lecture, Harvard Medical School, Boston (1994)
Aggeler Lecture, University of California School of Medicine, San Francisco (1995)
Honorary Professor, Chinese Academy of Medical Sciences and Peking Union Medical College (1999)
G. Burroughs Mider Lecture, National Institutes of Health (2005)
Leadership in Science Award, Aplastic Anemia Myelodysplastic Syndromes International Foundation (2007)
E. Donnall Thomas Lecture and Award, American Society of Hematology (2008)
Adolfo Storti Prize, Italian Society of Hematology (2009)
William C. Moloney Lectureship, Brigham and Women's Hospital, Harvard Medical School, Boston, 2009
Outstanding Work in Science as Related to Medicine, American College of Physicians (2010)
Honorary Doctor of Philosophy, Jichi Medical School (2011)
Samuel J. Heyman Service to America Medal, Science & Environment (2012)
Clement A. Finch Visiting Professor in Hematology, University of Washington (2014)
Erasmus Hematology Award, Erasmus MC, Rotterdam (2017)

Selected publications

Books 
Young, Neal S., Stanton L. Gerson, and Katherine A. High. eds. Clinical Hematology. Philadelphia: Mosby/Elsevier, 2006.
Rodgers, Griffin P., and Neal S. Young., eds. Bethesda Handbook of Clinical Hematology. Philadelphia: Lippincott Williams & Wilkins, 2005.
Young, Neal S., and Joel Moss. Paroxysmal Nocturnal Hemoglobinuria and the Glycosylphosphatidylinositol-Linked Proteins. San Diego: Academic Press, 2000.
Young, Neal S. Viruses and Bone Marrow: Basic Research and Clinical Practice. New York: M. Dekker, 1993.
 Neal S. Young, Alan S. Levine, and R. Keith Humphries, eds.Aplastic Anemia: Stem Cell Biology and Advances in Treatment : Proceedings of the Third International Conference on Aplastic Anemia, Held in Airlie, Virginia, June 26–28, 1983. New York: A.R. Liss, 1984.
Young, Neal S., and Blanche P. Alter. Aplastic Anemia, Acquired and Inherited. Philadelphia: Saunders, 1994.
Young, Neal S., ed. Viruses As Agents of Haematological Disease. London: Baillière Tindall, 1995.

References

External links 
Web Page at NIH

1947 births
Living people
American hematologists
Harvard College alumni
Johns Hopkins School of Medicine alumni
Washington University School of Medicine people